Evan Allan Watkin  (born 2 July 1951) is a New Zealand One-day International and Test cricket umpire. He was born in Te Aroha, Waikato.

He has umpired 3 Test matches, all played by New Zealand in Wellington and Napier.   His debut Test as an umpire was the 2nd Test against India in December 1998, and the second was the 2nd Test against West Indies in December 1999.

He has also umpired 23 One-day Internationals since 1995 - 21 of which were in the period from 1995 to 2002 - and 3 Twenty20 Internationals between 2006 and 2009.  All of these matches have been played in New Zealand.  Apart from his debut ODI, between India and South Africa in Hamilton on 18 February 1995, all have involved New Zealand.  He has been the third umpire in another 35 ODIs and 6 T20Is, all in New Zealand.

In the 2017 Queen's Birthday Honours, Watkin was awarded the Queen's Service Medal, for services to cricket.

See also
 List of Test cricket umpires
 List of One Day International cricket umpires
 List of Twenty20 International cricket umpires

References

Profile from Cricinfo

1951 births
Living people
New Zealand Test cricket umpires
New Zealand One Day International cricket umpires
New Zealand Twenty20 International cricket umpires
Sportspeople from Te Aroha
Recipients of the Queen's Service Medal